Cat Roberts (born Catherine Celeste Teed in Phoenix, Arizona) is an American actress, film producer, and physician.

Education
Roberts graduated summa cum laude from Arizona State University with a B.S. in Zoology. She earned her M.D. from the University of Arizona College of Medicine. She is Board Certified in both Radiology and Clinical Informatics. Roberts has over 100 publications in the scientific literature that have been cited over 2000 times.

Career
Roberts made her acting debut in Star Trek Continues where she reprised the classic 1960s Star Trek role of Lieutenant Palmer who was originally portrayed by Elizabeth Rogers. Roberts made her first appearance in the third Star Trek Continues episode, "Fairest of Them All", where she had a non-speaking role. She appeared as Lt. Palmer in all but one of the remaining episodes, with her role progressively expanding and becoming a core part of the cast.
It was her role in Star Trek Continues that caught the attention of the producers of The Red Shirt Diaries, who invited her to play another classic Star Trek character, Yeoman Janice Rand initially portrayed by Grace Lee Whitney.

Roberts then went on to play Janice Rand again in both The Federation Files and an unreleased episode of Star Trek New Voyages: Phase II. Roberts also reprised the role of Seven of Nine, initially portrayed by Jeri Ryan in Star Trek: Voyager, in a bonus scene of Raven: Voyager Continues, which was later renamed Starship Prometheus. Dr. Roberts was finalist for "Best Supporting Actor or Actress" in the Treklanta 2017 Independent Star Trek Fan Film Awards "Bjo Awards" for her performance as Lt. Palmer.

Due to her Star Trek roles, Roberts has been an invited guest at many comic conventions. At Salt Lake Comic Con 2016, she was part of the "Guests of Star Trek" group that included William Shatner, who first portrayed Captain James T. Kirk. She was part of the featured cast members who appeared at the Star Trek Continues Episode 4 Screening at the Creation Star Trek Las Vegas 2015 Convention. She was also a guest at Stan Lee's 2015 Comikaze Expo, Condor Con XXII 2016 convention, L.A. Comic Con 2017, and Phoenix Comicon 2017 convention. She was a featured program panelist at the Gallifrey One conventions in 2016 and 2018.

Her branch out from science fiction to westerns was announced in August 2019. Dr. Roberts appeared in four of Travis Mills’ “12 Westerns in 12 Months” project: The New Frontier, The Pleasant Valley War, The Woman Who Robbed the Stagecoach, and Heart of the Gun.

Filmography

Actress television

Actress film

Producer

Awards
 Nominated for “Best Supporting Actor or Actress” (2017) - Treklanta Independent Star Trek Fan Film Awards
Nominated for “Outstanding Performance by an Ensemble Cast” in Love Gods from Planet Zero (Summer 2021) - Lonely Wolf: London International Film Festival
Won “Best Supporting Actress” for The New Frontier (May 2021) - Onrios Film Awards
Won “Best Supporting Actress” for The Woman Who Robbed the Stagecoach (August 2021) - Cult Critic Film Awards
Won “Best Ensemble Cast” for Love Gods from Planet Zero (October 2021) - Boobs and Blood International Film Festival
Won Exceptional Merit as "Best Supporting Actress" for The Pleasant Valley War (Fall 2021) - Docs Without Borders International Film Festival
Won “Best Supporting Actress” for Heart of the Gun (December 2021) - 4th Dimension Independent Film Festival

References

External links

 

Year of birth missing (living people)
Living people
American film actresses
21st-century American actresses
Actresses from Phoenix, Arizona
American women physicians
American television actresses
University of Arizona alumni